The Lords Justices (more formally the Lords Justices General and General Governors of Ireland) were deputies who acted collectively in the absence of the chief governor of Ireland (latterly the Lord Lieutenant) as head of the executive branch of the Dublin Castle administration. Lords Justices were sworn in at a meeting of the Privy Council of Ireland.

History

After the Norman Conquest of Ireland, the chief governor of the Lordship of Ireland was appointed by the King of England via letters patent; in medieval times under his privy seal, and later under the Great Seal of England. The patent usually allowed the chief governor to nominate a deputy, though sometimes the King nominated a deputy, and if the chief governor died in office the Privy Council of Ireland would elect a deputy until the King nominated a successor. The title (originally French or Latin) of the chief governor depended on his power, from most to least: King's (or Lord) Lieutenant; (Lord) Deputy; Justiciar (or Lord Justice); and Keeper. The chief governor's deputy would have a lower title than the chief governor, and was appointed under the Great Seal of Ireland unless by the King. By the time of Henry VII, the Lord Deputy was the resident chief governor (or rarely the resident deputy of a non-resident Lord Lieutenant) and, in case of the Lord Deputy's temporary absence or vacancy, there was one or, later, two Lords Justices appointed by the Privy Council of Ireland. An Irish act of Poynings' Parliament specified that the Treasurer of Ireland would be "Justice & Governoure" until the King send a "lieutenunt or deputye". This was repealed three years later, but the statute roll was subsequently lost. A 1542 act formalised how the privy council would elect from among its members one or, if necessary, two Lords Justices, each of whom had to be a layman born in England. The same year the Crown of Ireland Act 1542 changed the Lordship into the Kingdom of Ireland.

In the 17th century, the King often left the chief governorship vacant for months or years and instead appointed multiple Lords Justices. This was so almost continuously from 1690 to 1700. Shortly before his 1696 death Lord Deputy Henry Capel nominated Murrough Boyle, 1st Viscount Blesington and William Wolseley to be Lords Justices; Charles Porter, Capel's rival and Lord Chancellor of Ireland, persuaded the Privy Council of Ireland that the deputies' commission expired on Capel's death, whereupon the council elected Porter as sole Lord Justice. Prior to 1767 the chief governor (now styled Lord Lieutenant or viceroy) was often absent in England unless the Parliament of Ireland was in session, typically eight months every two years. Whereas the Lord Lieutenant was a British peer, the Lords Justices were mostly Irishmen; they were influential and the English government needed their support. There were always three, typically the Speaker of the Irish House of Commons, another member of Irish Commons or Lords, and a senior bishop of the Church of Ireland.  After 1767 the viceroy was resident as a rule, and the practical importance of Lords Justices diminished. They were still required during vacancies between the death or departure of one viceroy and the arrival of his successor. A 1788 act repealed and replaced long-disregarded provisions of the 1542 act regarding election of Lords Justices, allowing up to three, who need not be laymen or English-born.

After the Acts of Union 1800, de facto executive power shifted from the viceroy to the Chief Secretary for Ireland, and the Lords Justices like the viceroy exercised only formal power. A newly arrived Lord Lieutenant would be escorted in state from Dunleary (later Kingstown) harbour to the Presence Chamber of Dublin Castle, where the Lords Justices were seated. The party would proceed to the Council Chamber, where the Lord Lieutenant would present his letters patent to the Privy Council, and another letter to the Lords Justices demanding the handover of the sword of state. Up to the mid-nineteenth century the usual Lords Justices were the Lord Chancellor, Church of Ireland Archbishop of Armagh or of Dublin, and Commander-in-Chief, Ireland. In 1868 it was ruled that a warrant signed in 1866 by only one of the three then Lords Justices was valid, because the patent appointing them allowed for this in case of absence "occasioned by sickness or any other necessary cause", and the cause did not have to be stated. After the Church of Ireland was disestablished in 1871, its prelates were no longer made Lords Justices, and usually only two were sworn in or the third was a second senior judge. 

Increasingly as the 19th century progressed, Lords Justices were sworn in during short absences from Dublin of the Lord Lieutenant, avoiding delay in validating the growing number of orders in council for routine administration. From 1890 to 1921 such absences averaged eight a year, lasting from days up to more than a month. For example, there were eleven occasions in 1897 in which various subsets of six men were sworn Lords Justices — usually three at a time, but four on two occasions and two on one occasion — the six being Somerset Lowry-Corry, 4th Earl Belmore,  Commander-in-Chief Earl Roberts, and four members of the Court of Appeal in Ireland (the Lord Chancellor, Vice-Chancellor, and Master of the Rolls, and Gerald FitzGibbon). While John Thomas Ball was serving as a Lord Justice, he seconded the nomination of Dodgson Hamilton Madden in the 1887 Dublin University by-election, which the Irish Parliamentary Party complained was inappropriate. 

In the Irish revolutionary period the Conscription Crisis of 1918 led prime minister David Lloyd George to suggest replacing the Lord Lieutenant on an emergency basis with three Lords Justices. It proved impossible to find three willing to serve; St John Brodrick, 1st Earl of Midleton was prepared to preside but demanded more control of policy than Lloyd George would cede. 

After the Anglo-Irish Treaty and partition of Ireland, the Lord Lieutenancy of Ireland was abolished by the Irish Free State (Consequential Provisions) Act 1922 and replaced by the Governor-General of the Irish Free State and Governor of Northern Ireland, which latter had deputies appointed by the Privy Council of Northern Ireland. The Irish Free State had no privy council: the Governor-General's default replacement would be the Chief Justice, but the sole suggestion of invoking this provision, at James McNeill's 1932 resignation, was not taken up.

List of Lords Justices

Until 1689 
Sir Thomas Cusack  (1552)
 Nicholas Arnold (May 1564–mid-1565)
 William Pelham (1579–80)

10 February–2 July 1616:
 Thomas Jones, (Church of Ireland Archbishop of Dublin and Lord Chancellor of Ireland)
 Sir John Denham, (Chief Justice of the Kings Bench for Ireland)

2 May–8 September 1622:
 Sir Adam Loftus (Lord Chancellor of Ireland)
 Richard Wingfield, 1st Viscount Powerscourt (Marshal of Ireland)

10 February 1641–January 1644:
 Sir John Borlase 
 Sir William Parsons (to March 1643)
 Sir Henry Tichborne (from 12 May 1643)

26 October 1660–July 1662:
 Maurice Eustace, Lord Chancellor
 Charles Coote, 1st Earl of Mountrath (died 17 December 1661)
 Roger Boyle, 1st Earl of Orrery

1690–1800
 Henri de Massue, Earl of Galway (6 February 1697–April 1701; 1715–16) in practice dominated his fellow Lords Justices; "but for being a foreigner, he would have been Lord-Lieutenant". 
 John Methuen accepted nomination as Lord Chancellor of Ireland in February 1697 but resiled from serving as a Lord Justice.
 Charles Paulet, 2nd Duke of Bolton (25 May 1697–1700)
 Edward Villiers, 1st Earl of Jersey (25 May 1697–1699) rarely in Ireland
 Charles Berkeley, 2nd Earl of Berkeley (1699–1700)
 Narcissus Marsh, Church of Ireland Archbishop of Armagh (1699, 1700–01, 1701–02, 1707, 1707–08, 1710)
 Constantine Phipps (1710) Lord Chancellor
 Richard Ingoldsby (1709–1710)
 Robert FitzGerald, 19th Earl of Kildare (1714)
 Colonel Sir Charles Feilding (1714) son of George Feilding, 1st Earl of Desmond
 Charles FitzRoy, 2nd Duke of Grafton (1715–16)
 Hugh Boulter, Church of Ireland Archbishop of Armagh (1726, 1730, 1732, 1734, 1736, 1737, 1738, 1740, 1742)
 Field Marshal Richard Molesworth, 3rd Viscount Molesworth (1736)

18th century

1801–1847

From 1848

5 May 1921:
 Six Lords Justices were sworn in, including the first three Catholics

27 June 1921:
 Nevil Macready, General Officer Commanding in Ireland, was sworn in as a Lord Justice in order to swear in Sir John Ross as Lord Chancellor. The Lords Justice previously appointed were all unavailable owing to the Anglo-Irish War.

28 June 1921: 
 The Lord Chief Justice Thomas Molony and the Master of the Rolls Charles O'Connor as Lords Justices opened the inoperative Parliament of Southern Ireland. (The Lord Lieutenant Viscount FitzAlan had opened the operative Parliament of Northern Ireland in person on 7 June.)

See also
 Presidential Commission (Ireland), three officials who collectively deputise for the President of Ireland
Various deputies for the British monarch:
 Regency Acts provide for a regent during a monarch's total incapacity
 Counsellor of State during partial incapacity, such as when abroad
 Lords Commissioners for routine Parliamentary functions

Sources
 
  I: 1603–1642; II: 1642–1660; III: 1660–1690

Citations

Political office-holders in pre-partition Ireland